Onetwo were an English synth-pop duo formed in 2000 by singer Claudia Brücken (Propaganda) and keyboardist/singer Paul Humphreys (Orchestral Manoeuvres in the Dark). Their collaboration had no name until 2004.

History
Brücken and Humphreys met in the early 1980s and became romantically involved in 1996. The two started working together on material for a planned Propaganda album, but when the Propaganda reunion fell through, the pair concentrated on working on their own songs. In 2000 the duo toured the United States, where they played songs by both OMD and Propaganda, along with some new material.

After four years of writing the duo finally recorded a five-track EP entitled Item, released in June 2004 via their own label, There(there).

In 2006, they performed live at Leicester Cathedral in August and at the London venue Too2Much in November. This was followed by a three-date Central/South American tour the same month. Onetwo's debut studio album, Instead, was released in February 2007 by There(there). In April, Onetwo toured Germany. Later that year they supported Erasure and the Human League.

In March 2013, Brücken and Humphreys ceased living and working together.

Discography

Studio albums
 Instead (2007)
01 - The Theory of Everything Part 1

02 - The Theory of Everything Part 2

03 - Sequential

04 - Home (Tonight)

05 - Signals

06 - Have a Cigar

07 - I Don't Blame You

08 - Cloud Nine

Guitar – Martin L. Gore

Guitar [Extra] – Rupert Webster

Keyboards [Extra], Electronics – Chuck Norman

Keyboards [Extra], Programmed By – Jon Russell

Written-By – Gore*

09 - Anonymous

10 - Heaven

11 - Kein Anschlu?

12 - The Weakness in Me

13 - A Vision in the Sky

EPs
 Item (2004)
01 - Sister

02 - Cloud 9

03 - Element of Truth

04 - Signals

05 - One and Only (Sister)

Singles
 "Cloud Nine" (2007)

References

External links
 Onetwo at MySpace
 There(there)

English synth-pop groups
English electronic music duos
Musical groups established in 2000
Musical groups disestablished in 2013